Drive a Crooked Road is a 1954 American crime film noir directed by Richard Quine and starring Mickey Rooney and Dianne Foster.  The drama's screenplay was adapted by Blake Edwards and Richard Quine from "The Wheel Man", a story by Canadian James Benson Nablo.

Plot
Mechanic and race car driver Eddie Shannon is chosen by two bank robbers to help them with a heist.  The heist requires someone with his ability to "soup up" engines and drive at high speeds over treacherous roads, to avoid capture after they pull the job.  To bait the driver into the dangerous scheme, one of the robbers uses his girlfriend, Barbara Mathews, to help persuade Eddie to assist with the crime—though his share of the heist would also make it possible for him to achieve his dream of racing competitively in Europe, the money alone wouldn't be sufficient inducement.  Barbara increasingly feels ashamed of leading Eddie on, and develops some feelings for him.  This leads to his discovery of the way he's been used, triggering a deadly confrontation at the end.

Cast

Critical reception
TV Guide called the film "A crisply done film noir with Rooney taken in by the universal emotional state that was at the root of many noir heroes' problems, loneliness."

The Philadelphia Inquirer was complimentary: "Apart from being a very fair melodrama ... [the film] ... serves as a reminder that, given the right role and good direction, Mickey Rooney is a talented young actor ... The film, as well as Rooney, stands up all the way. So do all the others in Columbia's small, handpicked cast ... first honors go uncontested to the 32-year-old star for a fine, affecting, and unaffected performance."

References

External links
 
 
 
 
 Drive a Crooked Road informational site and DVD review at DVD Beaver (includes images)

1954 films

American auto racing films
American crime thriller films
American heist films
American black-and-white films
Columbia Pictures films
1950s English-language films
Film noir
Films based on short fiction
Films directed by Richard Quine
Films set in Palm Springs, California
1950s crime thriller films
1950s heist films
1950s American films